Diplomatic relations between Egypt and Israel were established on February 26, 1980, after the signing of the Egypt–Israel peace treaty on March 26, 1979. The first Israeli ambassador to Egypt was Eliyahu Ben-Elissar.

List of ambassadors

See also
 List of ambassadors of Egypt to Israel

References

 
Israel
Egypt